Paanch Ghantey Mein Paanch Crore (also known as 5 Ghantey Mein 5 :Crore) is a Psycho Thriller film written and directed by Faisal Saif. This film is Pakistani film actor Meera's third Bollywood film in five years. The Times of India listed the film in Bollywood's Top 10 Bold Film category of 2012 along with films such as Ishaqzaade, Raaz 3 and Hate Story.

Plot
The film tells the story of chartered accountant Vikram (Played By Shawar Ali) and his keep Soniya (Played By Meera) who are waiting for another accountant Muqaadam (Played By Rashid Khan) to deliver R50 million hard cash to their farm house. Vikram works for Sultan Corporation which is owned by Sultan (Played By Ranjeet). As soon as Muqaadam delivers the money, Vikram and Sonia plans to kill Muqaadam and escape to Singapore next day with 50 million to start a new life.  Vikram and Soniya go exactly by their plan.  Enter Karan Oberoi (Abhishek Kumar) whose car breaks down in front of Vikram's farmhouse.  Karan also happens to be Soniya's ex-classmate in junior college. Reshma Salahuddin (Kavita Radheshyam), an exotic bar dancer who is 3 months pregnant and is waiting for her boyfriend Muqaadam to return.  Until she finds out Muqaadam is killed, starts a dirty game of love, betrayal, murder and deceit. Three people with 5 hours to go and with 50 million hard cash

Cast
 Meera as Sonia
 Abhishek Kumar as Karan Oberoi
 Kavita Radheshyam as Reshma Salahuddin
 Shawar Ali as Vikram
 Ranjeet as Sultaan Khan
 Nasser Abdullah as Inspector Raam Singh
 Rashid Khan as Accountant Muqaadam
 Sameer Bashir Khan as Rashid The Henchman

Production

Casting
Faisal Saif first approached critically acclaimed actress Tabu for the part of Sonia, but later opted for Pakistani actress Meera who was not only impressed with the script, but also did the film for free.

First look
Galaxy Lollywood covered the film's music and trailer launch by praising the trailer and music of the film. Independent Bollywood recently revealed the film's first look.

Release
The film was slated to release on 8 June 2012 along with Dibakar Banerjee's Shanghai, but it was postponed to 10 August 2012 Eid release along with Salman Khan's Ek Tha Tiger.

Reception

The film was not screened for press and critics as the director Faisal Saif wanted to show the film directly to the audience, The film managed a decent opening of 50% with its limited cinema release. Independent Bollywood gave the film 3 out of 5 Stars and called it 'A Tight Thriller'. Filmy Town gave the movie 2 out of 5 Stars and wrote 'A crisp screenplay that keeps the viewer hooked on to till the climax'.

Soundtrack
The soundtrack of the film was released by Worldwide Records (India). Joginder Tuteja of Bollywood Hungama gave the soundtrack 2.5 out of 5 Stars and wrote "Well, brace yourselves, as this one turns out to be one of the bigger surprises of the year. Give it a chance; it actually has quite a few good songs that manage to hold on to their own!". Music reviewer Amanda Sodhi wrote "It's totally worth it for O Sone Ke Kangna and Kya Wajah Thi Tere Jaane Ki".

Track listing

References

External links
 

2010s Hindi-language films
2012 films
2012 psychological thriller films
Indian psychological thriller films
Films directed by Faisal Saif